Marta Abreu de Estévez (13 November 1845 – 2 January 1909) was one of the most influential figures of her time in central Cuba, especially in her birth city and province of Santa Clara. For her constant aid to the poor, her donations to the city and the independence war, she won the title of "the great benefactor".

Biography
Her wealth enabled Marta Abreu to travel to Europe and the United States from a very young age, which brought her into contact with key figures of her time and allowed her to appreciate the differences between most developed countries and her own, and how difficult Cubans had it, specially in small hinterland cities and towns. She married , a lawyer and University professor from Matanzas who was also an advocate of independence cause and helper of the poor; in time this allowed Marta to fulfill her philanthropic dreams. They later moved to Europe because of her husband's poor health; she died at her home in Paris.

Legacy
 Teatro La Caridad (Charity Theater), which she built and donated to the city in order to collect money for further donations.
 Asilo de Ancianos, old people's home.
 Asilo San Vicente de Paul, to house the poor and homeless.
 El Amparo (The Shelter), another shelter for poor people.
 El Gran Cervantes, school for black children.
 Buen Viaje school.
 San Pedro Nolasco school.
 Santa Rosalía school.
 Santa Clara weather station, which she donated with all the instruments and scientific material.
 Santa Clara firefighters' quarters.
 Santa Clara electrical power plant.
 Santa Clara train station.
 Villa Clara province gas plant.
 Three public laundry stations by the Bélico river.

Memorials
 Santa Clara's University was named after her.
 Bronze statue in Parque Vidal. 
 A room is dedicated to her in Casa de la Ciudad house-museum and art gallery.
 In 1947 Cuba published four stamps celebrating the centenary of her birth.

References

Bibliography
 Cristobal Garcia, Angel. El teatro La Caridad. Colección Escambray, Publicigraf, 1993
 "Monument to Marta Abreu", Webshots.com

External links

1845 births
1909 deaths
People from Santa Clara, Cuba
19th-century Cuban people
Cuban philanthropists
19th-century Cuban women
19th-century philanthropists
19th-century women philanthropists